Jean Lampila (24 October 1808 – 14 February 1897) was a New Zealand missionary. He was born in Mazamet, France. Lampila joined the Society of Mary in 1840.

References

1808 births
1897 deaths
French emigrants to New Zealand
French Roman Catholic missionaries
Roman Catholic missionaries in New Zealand